Oklahoma Question 711 of 2004, was an amendment to the Oklahoma Constitution that defined marriage as the union of a man and a woman, thus rendering recognition or performance of same-sex marriages or civil unions null within the state prior to its being ruled unconstitutional. The referendum was approved by 76 percent of the voters.

On January 14, 2014, Judge Terence C. Kern of the United States District Court for the Northern District of Oklahoma declared Question 711 unconstitutional. The case, Bishop v. United States (formerly Bishop v. Oklahoma), was then stayed pending appeal. On July 18, 2014, the United States Court of Appeals for the Tenth Circuit ruled that Oklahoma's ban was unconstitutional. On October 6, 2014, the Supreme Court of the United States rejected Oklahoma's request for review, overturning all state laws banning same-sex marriage.

Contents
The text of the amendment states:

Results

See also
Same-sex marriage in Oklahoma
LGBT rights in Oklahoma

References

External links
 The Money Behind the 2004 Marriage Amendments -- National Institute on Money in State Politics
 The Gayly Oklahoman, LGBT newspaper in Oklahoma

LGBT in Oklahoma
U.S. state constitutional amendments banning same-sex unions
2004 in LGBT history
state question 771
Oklahoma state Question 771
Discrimination against LGBT people in the United States
Oklahoma ballot measures
Same-sex marriage ballot measures in the United States